"Thinking" is a song by Roger Daltrey that was written by David Courtney and Leo Sayer. The song was originally released on Daltrey's debut solo studio album, Daltrey and released as a single in 1973.

Cash Box said it was as powerful as "Giving It All Away."

The non-album B-side "There is Love" features Jimmy Page of Led Zeppelin on guitar. the song was left out because "It didn't fit in with the final context of the album." explained Daltrey "so we had to leave it out". The song is included on the Sanctuary remaster.

References

External links

1973 singles
Leo Sayer songs
Songs written by Leo Sayer
Polydor Records singles
Track Records singles
1973 songs
Songs written by David Courtney